Srednji Bušević (Serbian Cyrillic: Средњи Бушевић) is a village in the municipality of Bosanska Krupa, Bosnia and Herzegovina.

Demographics 
According to the 2013 census, its population was 0, down from 13 in 1991.

References

Populated places in Bosanska Krupa